Zacharias Kunuk  (born November 27, 1957) is a Canadian Inuk producer and director most notable for his film Atanarjuat: The Fast Runner, the first Canadian dramatic feature film produced entirely in Inuktitut. He is the president and co-founder with Paul Qulitalik, Paul Apak Angilirq, and the only non-Inuit, ex-New Yorker team member, Norman Cohn, of Igloolik Isuma Productions, Canada's first independent Inuit production company. Atanarjuat: The Fast Runner (2001), the first feature film that was entirely in Inuktitut was named as the greatest Canadian film of all time by the 2015 Toronto International Film Festival poll.

Background
Zacharias Kunuk was born in Kapuivik on Baffin Island in Canada. In 1966 he attended school in Igloolik. There he carved and sold soapstone sculptures to afford movie admissions. As his skill improved, he was able to buy cameras and photographed Inuit hunting scenes. When he heard about video cameras in 1981, he purchased a camera and the basic equipment to be able to teach himself how to create his own movies.

Career
His second film, The Journals of Knud Rasmussen, is a co-production with Denmark in which he is a co-writer and co-director with Norman Cohn. It premiered on September 7, 2006, as the opening film at the Toronto International Film Festival.

In 2002, Kunuk was made an Officer of the Order of Canada.

He is the son of Enoki Kunuk, a hunter who was lost for 27 days during June 2007 in the Arctic tundra.

Kunuk is the co-founder of the Inuit Knowledge and Climate Change Project, along with Ian Mauro of the University of Victoria's School of Environmental Studies. The goal of the project is to collect information from Inuit elders for a film about the Inuit perspective on the impact of climate change on Inuit culture and the environment. The project submitted a video to the United Nations for the 2009 COP15 Copenhagen Conference on Climate Change which was presented at Denmark's National Gallery.

As of April 2011, Kunuk is developing a project with Cree filmmaker Neil Diamond about the 18th century conflict between Cree and Inuit, which lasted almost a century.

In March 2019, Kunuk was made a member of the Order of Nunavut, the sole member of the Order's 2018 class.

Filmography
Feature films and television:
Nunavut: Our Land (1995) — director and writer of television series
Atanarjuat: The Fast Runner (2001) — director, producer, writer and editor
Kunuk Family Reunion (2004) — director and producer of television documentary
Weird Sex and Snowshoes: A Trek Through Canadian Cinematic Psyche (2004) — appeared in television documentary
The Journals of Knud Rasmussen (2006) — director, producer and art director
Before Tomorrow (Le Jour avant le lendemain) (2008) — executive producer
Tungijuq (2009) — executive producer of short
Home (2011) — director and writer of short
Sirmilik (2011) — director of documentary
Searchers (2016)
Edge of the Knife (2018) — executive producer
Kivitoo: What They Thought of Us (2018)
One Day in the Life of Noah Piugattuk (2019)
Angakusajaujuq: The Shaman's Apprentice (2021)

Academy of Motion Picture Arts and Sciences
In July 2017 the Academy of Motion Picture Arts and Sciences (AMPAS, also known as simply the Academy), invited Kunuk to become a member. The Academy, which has almost 7,000 motion picture professionals as members, is known internationally for their annual Academy Awards, the Oscars. In 2017 they invited 774 new members to join.

Awards

Books 

 Angakusajaujuq: The Shaman's Apprentice (2021)

See also
Notable Aboriginal people of Canada

References

External links
 

1957 births
Living people
Film directors from Nunavut
Film producers from Nunavut
Inuit from the Northwest Territories
Members of the Order of Nunavut
Officers of the Order of Canada
Best Director Genie and Canadian Screen Award winners
Inuit filmmakers
Best First Feature Genie and Canadian Screen Award winners
Indspire Awards
People from Igloolik
Directors of Genie and Canadian Screen Award winners for Best Short Documentary Film
Inuit from Nunavut
Best Editing Genie and Canadian Screen Award winners
Directors of Caméra d'Or winners